The Milgram experiment(s) on obedience to authority figures were a series of social psychology experiments conducted by Yale University psychologist Stanley Milgram. They measured the willingness of study participants, 40 men in the age range of 20 to 50 from a diverse range of occupations with varying levels of education, to obey an authority figure who instructed them to perform acts conflicting with their personal conscience. Participants were led to believe that they were assisting an unrelated experiment, in which they had to administer electric shocks to a "learner". These fake electric shocks gradually increased to levels that would have been fatal had they been real.

The experiment found, unexpectedly, that a very high proportion of subjects would fully obey the instructions, with every participant going up to 300 volts, and 65% going up to the full 450 volts. Milgram first described his research in a 1963 article in the Journal of Abnormal and Social Psychology and later discussed his findings in greater depth in his 1974 book, Obedience to Authority: An Experimental View.

The experiments began on August 7, 1961 (after the grant proposal was approved in July), in the basement of Linsly-Chittenden Hall at Yale University, three months after the start of the trial of German Nazi war criminal Adolf Eichmann in Jerusalem. Milgram devised his psychological study to explain the psychology of genocide and answer the popular contemporary question: "Could it be that Eichmann and his million accomplices in the Holocaust were just following orders? Could we call them all accomplices?" The experiment was repeated many times around the globe, with fairly consistent results.

Procedure

Three individuals took part in each session of the experiment:

 The "experimenter", who was in charge of the session.
 The "teacher", a volunteer for a single session. The "teachers" were led to believe that they were merely assisting, whereas they were actually the subjects of the experiment.
 The "learner", an actor and confederate of the experimenter, who pretended to be a volunteer.

The subject and the actor arrived at the session together. The experimenter told them that they were taking part in "a scientific study of memory and learning", to see what the effect of punishment is on a subject's ability to memorize content. Also, he always clarified that the payment for their participation in the experiment was secured regardless of its development. The subject and actor drew slips of paper to determine their roles. Unknown to the subject, both slips said "teacher". The actor would always claim to have drawn the slip that read "learner", thus guaranteeing that the subject would always be the "teacher".

Next, the teacher and learner were taken into an adjacent room where the learner was strapped into what appeared to be an electric chair. The experimenter, dressed in a lab coat in order to appear to have more authority, told the participants this was to ensure that the learner would not escape. In a later variation of the experiment, the confederate would eventually plead for mercy and yell that he had a heart condition. At some point prior to the actual test, the teacher was given a sample electric shock from the electroshock generator in order to experience firsthand what the shock that the learner would supposedly receive during the experiment would feel like.

The teacher and learner were then separated so that they could communicate, but not see each other. The teacher was then given a list of word pairs that he was to teach the learner. The teacher began by reading the list of word pairs to the learner. The teacher would then read the first word of each pair and read four possible answers. The learner would press a button to indicate his response. If the answer was incorrect, the teacher would administer a shock to the learner, with the voltage increasing in 15-volt increments for each wrong answer (if correct, the teacher would read the next word pair.)  The volts ranged from 15 to 450. The shock generator included verbal markings that vary from Slight Shock to Danger: Severe Shock. 

The subjects believed that for each wrong answer the learner was receiving actual shocks. In reality, there were no shocks. After the learner was separated from the teacher, the learner set up a tape recorder integrated with the electroshock generator, which played previously recorded sounds for each shock level. As the voltage of the fake shocks increased, the learner began making audible protests, such as banging repeatedly on the wall that separated him from the teacher. In every condition the learner makes/says a predetermined sound or word. When the highest voltages were reached, the learner fell silent.

If at any time the teacher indicated a desire to halt the experiment, the experimenter was instructed to give specific verbal prods. The prods were, in this order:

 Please continue or Please go on.
 The experiment requires that you continue.
 It is absolutely essential that you continue.
 You have no other choice; you must go on.

Prod 2 could only be used if prod 1 was unsuccessful. If the subject still wished to stop after all four successive verbal prods, the experiment was halted. Otherwise, the experiment was halted after the subject had elicited the maximum 450-volt shock three times in succession.

The experimenter also had prods to use if the teacher made specific comments. If the teacher asked whether the learner might suffer permanent physical harm, the experimenter replied, "Although the shocks may be painful, there is no permanent tissue damage, so please go on." If the teacher said that the learner clearly wants to stop, the experimenter replied, "Whether the learner likes it or not, you must go on until he has learned all the word pairs correctly, so please go on."

Predictions
Before conducting the experiment, Milgram polled fourteen Yale University senior-year psychology majors to predict the behavior of 100 hypothetical teachers. All of the poll respondents believed that only a very small fraction of teachers (the range was from zero to 3 out of 100, with an average of 1.2) would be prepared to inflict the maximum voltage. Milgram also informally polled his colleagues and found that they, too, believed very few subjects would progress beyond a very strong shock. He also reached out to honorary Harvard University graduate Chaim Homnick, who noted that this experiment would not be concrete evidence of the Nazis' innocence, due to fact that "poor people are more likely to cooperate". Milgram also polled forty psychiatrists from a medical school, and they believed that by the tenth shock, when the victim demands to be free, most subjects would stop the experiment. They predicted that by the 300-volt shock, when the victim refuses to answer, only 3.73 percent of the subjects would still continue, and they believed that "only a little over one-tenth of one percent of the subjects would administer the highest shock on the board."

Milgram suspected before the experiment that the obedience exhibited by Nazis reflected a distinct German character, and planned to use the American participants as a control group before using German participants, expected to behave closer to the Nazis. However, the unexpected results stopped him from conducting the same experiment on German participants.

Results
Subjects were uncomfortable administering the shocks, and displayed varying degrees of tension and stress. These signs included sweating, trembling, stuttering, biting their lips, groaning, and digging their fingernails into their skin, and some were even having nervous laughing fits or seizures. 14 of the 40 subjects showed definite signs of nervous laughing or smiling. Every participant paused the experiment at least once to question it. Most continued after being assured by the experimenter. Some said they would refund the money they were paid for participating. Although, a while after the experiment, Milgram found that many participants were happy to have taken part in the experiment.

Milgram summarized the experiment in his 1974 article "The Perils of Obedience", writing:

The original Simulated Shock Generator and Event Recorder, or shock box, is located in the Archives of the History of American Psychology.

Later, Milgram and other psychologists performed variations of the experiment throughout the world, with similar results. Milgram later investigated the effect of the experiment's locale on obedience levels by holding an experiment in an unregistered, backstreet office in a bustling city, as opposed to at Yale, a respectable university. The level of obedience, "although somewhat reduced, was not significantly lower." What made more of a difference was the proximity of the "learner" and the experimenter. There were also variations tested involving groups.

Thomas Blass of the University of Maryland, Baltimore County performed a meta-analysis on the results of repeated performances of the experiment. He found that while the percentage of participants who are prepared to inflict fatal voltages ranged from 28% to 91%, there was no significant trend over time and the average percentage for US studies (61%) was close to the one for non-US studies (66%).

The participants who refused to administer the final shocks neither insisted that the experiment be terminated, nor left the room to check the health of the victim without requesting permission to leave, as per Milgram's notes and recollections, when fellow psychologist Philip Zimbardo asked him about that point.

Milgram created a documentary film titled Obedience showing the experiment and its results. He also produced a series of five social psychology films, some of which dealt with his experiments.

Critical reception

Ethics
The Milgram Shock Experiment raised questions about the research ethics of scientific experimentation because of the extreme emotional stress and inflicted insight suffered by the participants. Some critics such as Gina Perry argued that participants were not properly debriefed. In Milgram's defense, 84 percent of former participants surveyed later said they were "glad" or "very glad" to have participated; 15 percent chose neutral responses (92% of all former participants responding). Many later wrote expressing thanks. Milgram repeatedly received offers of assistance and requests to join his staff from former participants. Six years later (at the height of the Vietnam War), one of the participants in the experiment wrote to Milgram, explaining why he was glad to have participated despite the stress:

On June 10, 1964, the American Psychologist published a brief but influential article by Diana Baumrind titled "Some Thoughts on Ethics of Research: After Reading Milgram's' Behavioral Study of Obedience.'" Baumrind's criticisms of the treatment of human participants in Milgram's studies stimulated a thorough revision of the ethical standards of psychological research. She argued that even though Milgram had obtained informed consent, he was still ethically responsible to ensure their well-being. When participants displayed signs of distress such as sweating and trembling, the experimenter should have stepped in and halted the experiment.

Applicability to the Holocaust
Milgram sparked direct critical response in the scientific community by claiming that "a common psychological process is centrally involved in both [his laboratory experiments and Nazi Germany] events." James Waller, chair of Holocaust and Genocide Studies at Keene State College, formerly chair of Whitworth College Psychology Department, expressed the opinion that Milgram experiments do not correspond well to the Holocaust events:

 The subjects of Milgram experiments, wrote James Waller (Becoming Evil), were assured in advance that no permanent physical damage would result from their actions. However, the Holocaust perpetrators were fully aware of their hands-on killing and maiming of the victims.
 The laboratory subjects themselves did not know their victims and were not motivated by racism or other biases. On the other hand, the Holocaust perpetrators displayed an intense devaluation of the victims through a lifetime of personal development.
 Those serving punishment at the lab were not sadists, nor hate-mongers, and often exhibited great anguish and conflict in the experiment, unlike the designers and executioners of the Final Solution, who had a clear "goal" on their hands, set beforehand.
 The experiment lasted for an hour, with no time for the subjects to contemplate the implications of their behavior. Meanwhile, the Holocaust lasted for years with ample time for a moral assessment of all individuals and organizations involved.

In the opinion of Thomas Blass—who is the author of a scholarly monograph on the experiment (The Man Who Shocked The World) published in 2004—the historical evidence pertaining to actions of the Holocaust perpetrators speaks louder than words:

Validity
In a 2004 issue of the journal Jewish Currents, Joseph Dimow, a participant in the 1961 experiment at Yale University, wrote about his early withdrawal as a "teacher", suspicious "that the whole experiment was designed to see if ordinary Americans would obey immoral orders, as many Germans had done during the Nazi period."

In 2012 Australian psychologist Gina Perry investigated Milgram's data and writings and concluded that Milgram had manipulated the results, and that there was a "troubling mismatch between (published) descriptions of the experiment and evidence of what actually transpired." She wrote that "only half of the people who undertook the experiment fully believed it was real and of those, 66% disobeyed the experimenter". She described her findings as "an unexpected outcome" that "leaves social psychology in a difficult situation."

In a book review critical of Gina Perry's findings, Nestar Russell and John Picard take issue with Perry for not mentioning that "there have been well over a score, not just several, replications or slight variations on Milgram’s basic experimental procedure, and these have been performed in many different countries, several different settings and using different types of victims. And most, although certainly not all of these experiments have tended to lend weight to Milgram's original findings."

Interpretations
Milgram elaborated two theories:

 The first is the theory of conformism, based on Solomon Asch conformity experiments, describing the fundamental relationship between the group of reference and the individual person. A subject who has neither ability nor expertise to make decisions, especially in a crisis, will leave decision making to the group and its hierarchy. The group is the person's behavioral model.
 The second is the agentic state theory, wherein, per Milgram, "the essence of obedience consists in the fact that a person comes to view themselves as the instrument for carrying out another person's wishes, and they therefore no longer see themselves as responsible for their actions. Once this critical shift of viewpoint has occurred in the person, all of the essential features of obedience follow".

Alternative interpretations
In his book Irrational Exuberance, Yale finance professor Robert J. Shiller argues that other factors might be partially able to explain the Milgram experiments:

In a 2006 experiment, a computerized avatar was used in place of the learner receiving electrical shocks.  Although the participants administering the shocks were aware that the learner was unreal, the experimenters reported that participants responded to the situation physiologically "as if it were real".

Another explanation of Milgram's results invokes belief perseverance as the underlying cause. What "people cannot be counted on is to realize that a seemingly benevolent authority is in fact malevolent, even when they are faced with overwhelming evidence which suggests that this authority is indeed malevolent. Hence, the underlying cause for the subjects' striking conduct could well be conceptual, and not the alleged 'capacity of man to abandon his humanity ... as he merges his unique personality into larger institutional structures."'

This last explanation receives some support from a 2009 episode of the BBC science documentary series Horizon, which involved replication of the Milgram experiment. Of the twelve participants, only three refused to continue to the end of the experiment. Speaking during the episode, social psychologist Clifford Stott discussed the influence that the idealism of scientific inquiry had on the volunteers. He remarked: "The influence is ideological. It's about what they believe science to be, that science is a positive product, it produces beneficial findings and knowledge to society that are helpful for society. So there's that sense of science is providing some kind of system for good."

Building on the importance of idealism, some recent researchers suggest the "engaged followership" perspective. Based on an examination of Milgram's archive, in a recent study, social psychologists Alexander Haslam, Stephen Reicher and Megan Birney, at the University of Queensland, discovered that people are less likely to follow the prods of an experimental leader when the prod resembles an order. However, when the prod stresses the importance of the experiment for science (i.e. "The experiment requires you to continue"), people are more likely to obey. The researchers suggest the perspective of "engaged followership": that people are not simply obeying the orders of a leader, but instead are willing to continue the experiment because of their desire to support the scientific goals of the leader and because of a lack of identification with the learner. Also a neuroscientific study supports this perspective, namely that watching the learner receive electric shocks does not activate brain regions involving empathic concerns.

Replications and variations

Milgram's variations
In Obedience to Authority: An Experimental View (1974), Milgram describes 19 variations of his experiment, some of which had not been previously reported.

Several experiments varied the distance between the participant (teacher) and the learner. Generally, when the participant was physically closer to the learner, the participant's compliance decreased. In the variation where the learner's physical immediacy was closest—where the participant had to hold the learner's arm onto a shock plate—30 percent of participants completed the experiment. The participant's compliance also decreased if the experimenter was physically farther away (Experiments 1–4). For example, in Experiment 2, where participants received telephonic instructions from the experimenter, compliance decreased to 21 percent. Some participants deceived the experimenter by pretending to continue the experiment.

In Experiment 8, an all-female contingent was used; previously, all participants had been men. Obedience did not significantly differ, though the women communicated experiencing higher levels of stress.

Experiment 10 took place in a modest office in Bridgeport, Connecticut, purporting to be the commercial entity "Research Associates of Bridgeport" without apparent connection to Yale University, to eliminate the university's prestige as a possible factor influencing the participants' behavior. In those conditions, obedience dropped to 47.5 percent, though the difference was not statistically significant.

Milgram also combined the effect of authority with that of conformity. In those experiments, the participant was joined by one or two additional "teachers" (also actors, like the "learner"). The behavior of the participants' peers strongly affected the results. In Experiment 17, when two additional teachers refused to comply, only four of 40 participants continued in the experiment. In Experiment 18, the participant performed a subsidiary task (reading the questions via microphone or recording the learner's answers) with another "teacher" who complied fully. In that variation, 37 of 40 continued with the experiment.

Replications

Around the time of the release of Obedience to Authority in 1973–1974, a version of the experiment was conducted at La Trobe University in Australia. As reported by Perry in her 2012 book Behind the Shock Machine, some of the participants experienced long-lasting psychological effects, possibly due to the lack of proper debriefing by the experimenter.

In 2002, the British artist Rod Dickinson created The Milgram Re-enactment, an exact reconstruction of parts of the original experiment, including the uniforms, lighting, and rooms used. An audience watched the four-hour performance through one-way glass windows. A video of this performance was first shown at the CCA Gallery in Glasgow in 2002.

A partial replication of the experiment was staged by British illusionist Derren Brown and broadcast on UK's Channel 4 in The Heist (2006). 

Another partial replication of the experiment was conducted by Jerry M. Burger in 2006 and broadcast on the Primetime series Basic Instincts. Burger noted that "current standards for the ethical treatment of participants clearly place Milgram's studies out of bounds." In 2009, Burger was able to receive approval from the institutional review board by modifying several of the experimental protocols. Burger found obedience rates virtually identical to those reported by Milgram in 1961–62, even while meeting current ethical regulations of informing participants. In addition, half the replication participants were female, and their rate of obedience was virtually identical to that of the male participants. Burger also included a condition in which participants first saw another participant refuse to continue. However, participants in this condition obeyed at the same rate as participants in the base condition.

In the 2010 French documentary Le Jeu de la Mort (The Game of Death), researchers recreated the Milgram experiment with an added critique of reality television by presenting the scenario as a game show pilot. Volunteers were given €40 and told that they would not win any money from the game, as this was only a trial. Only 16 of 80 "contestants" (teachers) chose to end the game before delivering the highest-voltage punishment.

The experiment was performed on Dateline NBC on an episode airing April 25, 2010.

The Discovery Channel aired the "How Evil are You?" segment of Curiosity on October 30, 2011.  The episode was hosted by Eli Roth, who produced results similar to the original Milgram experiment, though the highest-voltage punishment used was 165 volts, rather than 450 volts. Roth added a segment in which a second person (an actor) in the room would defy the authority ordering the shocks, finding more often than not, the subjects would stand up to the authority figure in this case.

Other variations
Charles Sheridan and Richard King (at the University of Missouri and the University of California, Berkeley, respectively) hypothesized that some of Milgram's subjects may have suspected that the victim was faking, so they repeated the experiment with a real victim: a "cute, fluffy puppy" who was given real, albeit apparently harmless, electric shocks. Their findings were similar to those of Milgram: seven out of 13 of the male subjects and all 13 of the female subjects obeyed throughout. Many subjects showed high levels of distress during the experiment, and some openly wept. In addition, Sheridan and King found that the duration for which the shock button was pressed decreased as the shocks got higher, meaning that for higher shock levels, subjects were more hesitant.

Media depictions

 Obedience to Authority is Milgram's own account of the experiment, written for a mass audience.
 Obedience is a black-and-white film of the experiment, shot by Milgram himself. It is distributed by Alexander Street Press.
 The Tenth Level was a fictionalized 1975 CBS television drama about the experiment, featuring William Shatner and Ossie Davis.
 Peter Gabriel's 1986 album So features the song "We Do What We're Told (Milgram's 37)" based on the experiment and its results.
 Batch '81 is a 1982 Filipino film that features a scene based on the Milgram experiment.
 Atrocity is a 2005 film re-enactment of the Milgram Experiment.
 The Heist, a 2006 TV special by Derren Brown, features a reenactment of the Milgram experiment.
 "Authority" is an episode of Law & Order: Special Victims Unit inspired by the Milgram experiment.
 Experimenter, a 2015 film about Milgram, by Michael Almereyda, was screened to favorable reactions at the 2015 Sundance Film Festival.

See also

 Argument from authority 
 Authority bias
 Banality of evil
 Belief perseverance
 Graduated Electronic Decelerator
 Hofling hospital experiment
 Human experimentation in the United States
 Law of Due Obedience
 Little Eichmanns
 Moral disengagement
 My Lai Massacre
 Ordinary Men (book)
 Social influence
 Stanford prison experiment
 Superior orders
 The Third Wave (experiment)

Citations

General and cited references

 
  Book review of The Man Who Shocked the World
 
 
  Includes an interview with one of Milgram's volunteers, and discusses modern interest in, and scepticism about, the experiment.

Further reading

External links

 Milgram S. The Milgram Experiment (full documentary film on YouTube).
 
 Stanley Milgram Redux, TBIYTB — Description of a 2007 iteration of Milgram's experiment at Yale University, published in The Yale Hippolytic, January 22, 2007. (Internet Archive)
 A Powerpoint presentation describing Milgram's experiment
 Synthesis of book A faithful synthesis of Obedience to Authority – Stanley Milgram
 Obedience To Authority — A commentary extracted from 50 Psychology Classics (2007)
 A personal account of a participant in the Milgram obedience experiments
 Summary and evaluation of the 1963 obedience experiment
 The Science of Evil from ABC News Primetime
 The Lucifer Effect: How Good People Turn Evil — Video lecture of Philip Zimbardo talking about the Milgram Experiment.
  — Article on the 45th anniversary of the Milgram experiment.
 
 
 People 'still willing to torture'—BBC News
 Beyond the Shock Machine, a radio documentary with the people who took part in the experiment. Includes original audio recordings of the experiment

Articles containing video clips
Conformity
Group processes
History of psychology
Human subject research in the United States
Psychology experiments
Research ethics
Social influence